Balthazar River may refer to:

Balthazar River (Dominica)
Balthazar River (Grenada)